Abhurite is a mineral of tin, oxygen, hydrogen, and chlorine with the formula Sn21O6(OH)14Cl16 or Sn3O(OH)2Cl2. It is named after its type locality, a shipwreck with tin ingots at Sharm Abhur, a cove near Jeddah in the Red Sea. Abhurite forms alongside other tin minerals like romarchite and cassiterite.

Locality and formation 
Abhurite is attributed for forming on tin materials when in contact with sea water. The mineral was described in 1977 from a shipwreck near Hidra Island, Norway, where it occurred on pewter plates. However, that report was not recognized by the International Mineralogical Association. Along with Sharm Abhur and the shipwreck near Hidra Island, abhurite was found on tin ingots in the Uluburun shipwreck. On the ingots, it was found with other tin minerals like cassiterite and romarchite, and calcium carbonate minerals like calcite and aragonite.

See also
 List of minerals

References

Tin minerals
Halide minerals
Trigonal minerals
Minerals in space group 155